Compassion is a profound and positive human emotion prompted by the pain of others.  The following are related:
Compassion fatigue
Radical compassion
Self-compassion

Compassion may also refer to:

Organizations
Compassion International, a Christian child sponsorship organization
Compassion & Choices, American right-to-die organization
Compassion in World Farming, British  animal welfare organization

Music
Compassion (Hank Jones album), 1978
Compassion (Cecil McBee album), 1979
Compassion (Nigel Westlake, Lior and Sydney Symphony Orchestra album), 2013
Compassion (Forest Swords album), 2017
Compassion (Wadada Leo Smith album), 2006
Compassion (Royal Coda album), 2019
"Compassion", a song by Timothy B. Schmit from the 2009 album Expando

Entertainment
Compassion (Doctor Who), a fictional character in the Eighth Doctor Adventures novels
Love! Valour! Compassion!, Broadway play
Love! Valour! Compassion! (film), American film based on the play
 Compassion, short-story written by Dorothy Allison

Other
8990 Compassion, an asteroid
Charter for Compassion
Nīlakaṇṭha Dhāraṇī, "Great Compassion"